Madison Street Bridge may refer to:

Madison Street Bridge (Chicago), a crossing of the Chicago River
Madison Street Bridge (Portland, Oregon), the name of two former bridges over the Willamette River